Rho GTPase activating protein 44 is a protein in humans that is encoded by the ARHGAP44 gene.

References

External links

Further reading

Genes on human chromosome 17